The World Trade Report (WTR) is the annual report published since 2003 by the World Trade Organization. Each WTR provides an in-depth analysis of an aspect of trends in international trade, trade policy issues and the multilateral trading system.

2016 Report
The 2016 World Trade Report examines the participation of Small and medium-sized enterprises (SMEs) in international trade, how the international trade landscape is changing for SMEs, and what the multilateral trading system does and can do to encourage more widespread and inclusive SME participation in global markets.

List of World Trade Reports

2018: The future of world trade: How digital technologies are transforming global commerce
2017: Trade, technology and jobs
2016: Levelling the trading field for SMEs
2015: Speeding up trade: benefits and challenges of implementing the WTO Trade Facilitation Agreement
2014: Trade and development: recent trends and the role of the WTO
2013: Factors shaping the future of world trade
2012: Trade and public policies: A closer look at non-tariff measures in the 21st century
2011: The WTO and preferential trade agreements: From co-existence to coherence
2010: Trade in Natural Resources
2009: Trade Policy Commitments and Contingency Measures
2008: Trade in a Globalizing World
2007: Six decades of multilateral trade cooperation: What have we learnt?
2006: Subsidies, trade and the WTO
2005: Trade, standards and the WTO
2004: Coherence
2003: Trade and development

External links
 World Trade Report

World Trade Organization
International trade organizations
Annual publications